Rover may refer to:

People

Name
 Constance Rover (1910–2005), English historian
 Jolanda de Rover (born 1963), Dutch swimmer
 Rover Thomas (c. 1920–1998), Indigenous Australian artist

Stage name
 Rover (musician), French singer-songwriter and musician, born Timothée Régnier in 1979

Places
 Rover, Arkansas, US
 Rover, Missouri, US
 Rover, West Virginia, US
 Røver Anchorage, Bouvet Island, Norway
 Rover Creek, British Columbia, Canada

Arts and entertainment

Literature
 Rover, the US title of They Came on Viking Ships, a children's novel by Jackie French
 The Rover (story paper), a British boys' story paper which started in 1922

Music
 "Rover" (BlocBoy JB song), 2018
 "Rover 2.0", a 2018 remake by BlocBoy JB featuring 21 Savage from the mixtape Simi
 "Rover" (S1mba song), 2020 viral hit by S1mba featuring DTG
 "Rover" (UCLA song), a sports cheer at the University of California Los Angeles
 "The Rover" (Led Zeppelin song), a song by Led Zeppelin on their 1975 double album Physical Graffiti
 "The Irish Rover", an Irish folk song about a magnificent sailing ship that reaches an unfortunate end
 Rover, a 2023 extended play by South Korean singer Kai

Fiction
 Rover (robot dog), a character on Lunar Jim always helping on Jim's missions
 Rover (The Prisoner), a fictional balloon device in the 1967 British television program The Prisoner
 Rover, the main character in the novella Roverandom by J.R.R. Tolkien
 Rover, the name of two vehicles with artificial intelligence, built by Marvel Comics' Hank Pym
 The Rovers, an informal name for the Rovers Return Inn, a fictional pub in British soap opera Coronation Street

Television
 Rovers (TV series), a British television show

Science
 Rover (space exploration), a vehicle that explores the surface of an astronomical body
 Lunar rover, a vehicle designed to move across the surface of the Moon
 Mars rover, a vehicle designed to explore the surface of Mars
 ROVER, a military system that receives video images from aircraft

Sport
 Rover (ice hockey), a long-defunct ice hockey position
 Rover, a position in Australian rules football

Transport

Automobiles and motorcycles
 Freight Rover (1981–1986), a commercial vehicle manufacturing division of Leyland
 Land Rover Group (1981–1987), a light commercial vehicle division of Leyland
 Land Rover, a brand of 4-wheel drive vehicles by the British manufacturer Jaguar Land Rover
 MG Rover Group (2000–2005), a British mass-production car manufacturer, formerly the Rover Group
 Rover Company (1885–1967), a British car manufacturing company, absorbed into Leyland Motor Corporation
 Rover Group (1986–2000), a British car manufacturer, previously known as British Leyland
 Rover Light Armoured Car, an armoured car produced in Australia during World War II
 Rover (marque), British automotive marque (brand) in use from 1904 to 2005
 Rover (motorcycles), a British bicycle and motorcycle manufacturer before it began the manufacture of motor cars

Business (transport)
 Rover (ticket), a type of bus or train travel card ticket issued in the UK
 Rover Coaches, an Australian bus company operating services in the Hunter Valley

Locomotives
 GWR Rover class, a class of locomotives on the Great Western Railway
 Rover, a GWR 3031 Class locomotive in service on the Great Western Railway between 1891 and 1915

Watercraft
 HMS Rover, the name of seven ships of the Royal Navy
 Rover (barque), the American merchant ship involved in the Rover Incident of 1867
 Rover (log canoe), a Chesapeake Bay log canoe, built about 1886
 Rover (privateering ship), a ship from Nova Scotia, launched in 1800
 Rover (yacht), a luxury steam yacht built for P&O chairman, Lord Inchcape, in 1930
 Rover-class tanker, a class of ships in the Royal Fleet Auxiliary of the UK

Other uses
 Rover (fish), common name for fish in the family Emmelichthyidae
 Rover chair, designed by industrial designer Ron Arad
 Rover Ruckus, the fourteenth FIRST Tech Challenge game
 Rover Scout, a programme within Scouting in some countries for young men and women above the age range for Boy and Girl Scouts
 Rover.com (website), a Seattle-based company selling pet services

See also
 Rovere (disambiguation)
 The Rover (disambiguation)
 Rovers (disambiguation)